Geoffrey Brown may refer to:

 Geoffrey Brown (Australian politician) (1894–1955), Member for McMillan, 1949–1955
 Geoffrey F. Brown (born 1943), former commissioner of the California Public Utilities Commission
 Geoff Brown (tennis) (born 1924), Australian tennis player of the 1940s and 1950s
 Geoff Brown (businessman) (born 1943), Scottish businessman
 Geoff Brown (RAAF officer) (born 1958), senior officer in the Royal Australian Air Force
 Geoff Brown (water polo) (born 1955), Canadian Olympic water polo player
 Geoff Brown, the founder of video game companies U.S. Gold, Silicon Dreams Studio and Kaboom Studios
 A pseudonym of Leo Dorfman

See also
 Geoffrey Browne (disambiguation)
 Jeffrey Brown (disambiguation)
 Jeff Brown (disambiguation)